Magill was an Irish politics and current affairs magazine.

It may also refer to:

 Magill (surname) (including a list of people with the name)
 Magill, South Australia, suburb of Adelaide, South Australia
 Magill Cottage, historic cure cottage in Franklin County, New York, US
 Magill House, historic house in DeWitt County, Illinois, US

See also
 Magill forceps, intubation forceps
 Magill's History of Europe, a 1993 book
 Porter v Magill [2001], a UK administrative law case
 McGill (disambiguation)